Sega World (Japanese: セガワールド, Hepburn: Segawārudo), sometimes stylized as SegaWorld, is a formerly international chain of amusement arcades and entertainment centres created by Sega. Though not the first venues to be developed by the company, with operations dating back to the late 1960s in Japan, it would come to involve some of their most prolific and successful examples in the 1990s and 2000s. During their peak period in the 1990s, there were likely at least several hundred Sega World locations across the world.

Off the back of the initial success of the venues, Sega were able to expand into developing the Joypolis indoor theme parks and several other amusement and entertainment centre chains. However, a large majority of these were closed in the 2000s, primarily due to a worldwide decline in the amusement arcade industry rendering some centres unprofitable, an ongoing recession in Japan, and cost-cutting measures at Sega in the midst of their restructuring. Recent years have seen the name fall out of favour, with most of the remaining venues now using generic "Sega" branding. Alongside these, they currently continue to be operated under the Sega name by Genda Inc., after their 85.1% majority acquisition of Sega Entertainment's shares in 2020. In January 2022, Genda acquired the remaining shares and announced that it would rebrand all of Sega's venues under the name GiGO (reviving one of Sega's previous brands).

One of the most significant uses of the name was for the SegaWorld London and Sega World Sydney indoor theme park venues in the late 90s; these were both short-lived and closed after three years of operations.

Operations

Sega Worlds are most typically standard amusement arcades featuring Sega's own coin-operated arcade machines, alongside others. Though frequently housed in purpose-built suburban buildings, they have also been developed in other settings, including shopping centres, bowling alleys, department stores, and theme parks. Many have been specifically designed to appeal to families, although the association with their parent company has meant continued interest from video gaming enthusiasts.

Venues can vary in size, but with a number of now-defunct exceptions do not house the large-scale attractions and rides that are more often found in Joypolis indoor theme parks. Because of their association with Sega, some are used as location testing grounds for new games and machines developed by the company. Several locations are also known to have contained extra amenities, such as onsite shopping and food outlets.

Particularly in the 90s, many of the centres featured elaborate décor and designs based on the popular Sonic the Hedgehog character, primarily used as a recognisable mascot for family appeal. Several venues contained purpose-built statues and theming, although usage of these has declined in more recent years, with a large number of locations renovated and stripped of their outdated branding to fall in line with the generic "Sega" brand.

Notable venues

Japan
Having already been the location of many Hi-Tech Sega and Hi-Tech Land Sega game centres since the mid 1980s and unbranded Sega amusement centres as far back as the late 1960s, Japan was the first territory to receive venues under the Sega World name. Numbers of them are thought to have reached the hundreds during the 1990s, with a smaller number of sites still operational.

Sega World Ito Yokado Obihiro - Opened on 25 February 1989 in an Ito-Yokado department store. Designed to appeal to families with children and the earliest known venue to use the Sega World name, but ceased operations in the years that followed.
O2 Park Sega World- Opened on 26 April 1990. Originally designed to appeal to both families and young adults, with a musical design motif and a mix of video games and children's rides. Currently continues to operate as a rebranded Club Sega game centre.

Sega World Tokyo Roof - Opened on 14 September 1990 as part of the Tokyo Roof entertainment exhibition. Was not planned to be permanent, and closed after 290 days of operation on 30 June 1991. Notably featured a Sega Super Circuit installation and R360 units.
Sega World Shizuoka - Opened on 20 September 1991. Was Japan's largest game centre up to that point in time, taking up 1,960 sq.m. on two floors and housing a CCD Cart attraction. Closed on 5 January 2020 after 29 years of operation.
Sega World Hakkeijima Carnival House - Opened on 8 May 1993 in the Yokohama Hakkeijima Sea Paradise aquarium theme park. Featured a carnival design motif, and contained AS-1 and Virtua Formula attractions in its first years of operation. Sega are believed to have stopped running the centre in 2010, though it continues to stay open as a game centre to this day.
Sega World Kadoma - Thought to have opened at some point during the mid 90s and was remodeled in 2005/2006, and closed in 2006/2007. A situation arose in 2019 where a Sonic the Hedgehog statue once housed in the venue was discovered at an outdoor location in the mountains of Iga, Mie Prefecture, and was later restored in 2020 after being widely publicised by YouTube videos.
Sega World Tomioka: Opened in 1995, the venue was one of many buildings abandoned after the 2011 Fukushima Daiichi nuclear disaster. Originally, the arcade was to be repaired and remodeled after the earthquake, but due to the radiation, it was left to remain standing but not open and dilapidated remains of it (with unremoved arcade machines intact) remained until November 2020, when the arcade began being dismantled and was completed around the start of 2021. The rest of the building parts, signages and games were likely destroyed as they had been contaminated prior to the dismantling.
Sega World Apollo - Originally known as Apollo Vegas upon opening in July 1972, rebranded to become a Sega World at a later date. Thought to be Sega's longest-running arcade venue, surviving numerous restructures and periods of losses in the company.

United Kingdom
With operations assisted by Deith Leisure, the UK is believed to have been the country to receive the most Sega World locations outside of Japan, though all of them have since closed permanently. Newer arcade venues affiliated with Sega continue to be run in the country under the Sega Prize Zone and Sega Active Zone names.

Sega World Bournemouth: Opened on 24 July 1993 on Westover Road, occupying 35,000m² of its building. Was Sega's initial flagship arcade venue in Europe, also containing a Burger King outlet, official Sega shop and mini bowling alley lanes, among other extra facilities. Later made significant losses in off-season periods, with many of its features removed in the years that followed, and eventually became a Sega Park in 1998. After changing ownership twice, around 1/4th of its original space continues to operate as a rebranded arcade and bowling alley.
Sega World Tamworth: Opened sometime between 1994 and 1996. Located above a Strykers Pleasure Bowl bowling alley on River Drive, taking up much of its first floor. Later moved downstairs to a smaller area under the new name of Sega Park, and became a Namco Station venue in 2001, which it has remained as since.

Sega World Birmingham: Opened sometime between 1994 and 1996, took up the floor space above a Blockbuster Video store on Erdington High Street. Closed in the late 90s after falling into a period of decline, with its former space subsequently converted to a tanning salon and later UTC gym.
Sega World Wolverhampton: Opened sometime between 1994 and 1996. Located within a now-defunct Strykers Pleasure Bowl bowling alley on West Shaw Road, Bushbury, and later replaced by a pool hall and smaller unbranded arcade area in the late 90s. The building that it was once housed in was destroyed in a fire. An advertisement for the venue still exists on a bridge several streets away from its former grounds.
SegaWorld London: Opened to the public on 7 September 1996. Was Sega's first indoor theme park outside of Japan, became their flagship venue in Europe, and occupied a total area of 10200m² on seven floors of the London Trocadero complex. Cashflow issues largely caused by mismanagement of various aspects and poor reviews forced Sega to pull out of the venue under contract exactly three years after opening, with the floors latterly becoming the ownership of Family Leisure, operators of the Funland arcade situated elsewhere in the Trocadero. Officially became known as Funland in February 2000, which subsequently downsized in September 2002 and closed permanently on 4 July 2011 after further mismanagement problems.

Australia

Sega expanded operations to Australia in the late 1990s, after previously establishing venues in other overseas territories during the earlier part of the decade. Though several venues are known to have been planned for the country, only one ultimately came to fruition.

Sega World Sydney: Opened on 18 March 1997 as the main tenant of the Darling Walk complex in Darling Harbour. Was the second and final overseas Sega World indoor theme park, containing copies of numerous attractions previously seen in Joypolis venues and SegaWorld London. Suffered due to lower than expected visitor turnout after initial success, and closed permanently in November 2000 after the 2000 Summer Olympics did not improve numbers. Later demolished in November 2008.

Taiwan
Taiwan is thought to have been the earliest territory outside of Japan to receive Sega World locations, after Sega Amusement Taiwan was formed to handle operations in the county in late 1991. Though Sega arcade venues continue to operate in the country, none are under the Sega World name.

Sega World Chiayi City: Opened on 1 February 1992. Located in the Chia-Ya City department store, owned by Far Eastern Group and occupying 560m². Sega's first arcade in the region and thought to have been the first overseas Sega World, but has since closed permanently.
Sega World Wanguo: Opened in June 1993. Located on the first floor of the IWC Department store, and primarily contained claw and photo sticker machines, as well as a crepe shop. Thought to have closed at some point after the mid-2000s.
Sega World Oe: Opened on 14 January 1994. Originally situated on the third and fourth floors of the Dajiang Shopping Centre mall, more recently downsized and rebranded to only occupy the fourth. Contained a Wild River attraction more typically found in Joypolis venues during the mid 2000s.

China
Little is currently known about Sega World operations in China - the few venues opened are thought to have closed around the time or before the later Player's Arena and Joypolis indoor theme parks were developed in the country.
Sega World Shanghai: Located in the basement of the Metro-City shopping centre. Was open during the 2000s and possibly earlier.
Sega World Beijing: Located in the Beijing apm shopping centre. Closed some point after 2010.

South Korea
South Korea received at least two Sega World locations in the mid-2000s managed by Sega Korea; both are now defunct.

Sega World Gwonseon-gu: Opened on 25 August 2005, closed little over a year later in October 2006.
Sega World Jukjeon: Opened on 9 September 2005, closed May 2007.

Other venues
Other amusement venues operated by Sega have included:

P.J. Pizzazz: A chain of family entertainment centres planned for North America that imitated the more successful Chuck E. Cheese. Two locations were opened in the early 1980s, before a re-evaluation in 1982 causing Sega to discontinue the scheme.
Time-Out: A chain of amusement arcades in North America owned by Sega for a three-year period from 1987 to 1990.
Gameworks: A chain of mixed-use entertainment venues operated in America, formerly affiliated with Sega.
Sega City: A short-lived chain of large amusement arcades in North America in the mid 1990s. Several locations were rebranded to use the GameWorks name, with others closed permanently within a few years of opening.
Hi-Tech Sega: A chain of small inner-city venues in Japan from the mid-1980s to 2000s.
Hi-Tech Land Sega: A chain of larger inner-city venues in Japan from the mid-1980s to 2000s.
Galbo: A chain of a small number of smaller indoor theme park venues in Japan in the mid to late 1990s.
GiGO: A chain of larger inner-city venues in Japan from the early 1990s to late 2000s. It is an abbreviation of "Get into the Gaming Oasis".
Club Sega: A chain of larger inner-city entertainment venues in Japan from the late 1990s to late 2000s.
Sega Arena: A chain of larger entertainment centre venues located in Japan and briefly Taiwan.
Sega Park: A chain of smaller amusement arcades operated in the UK, Spain, and Portugal during the 1990s and 2000s.
Sega Republic: A now-defunct indoor theme park located in the Dubai Mall that operated from 2009 until 2017. It is now home to a VR-focused theme park.
Sega: A chain of one-off venues with differing names from the 1990s to 2000s, and most recently the standardised name for almost all game centres affiliated with Sega in Japan and Taiwan, including the three long-standing locations in Akihabara. these venues are currently under a phase of being rebranded under the GiGO name.
Joypolis: A chain of indoor theme park venues located in Japan and China.

References

Sonic the Hedgehog
Sega amusement parks